Always the Woman is a 1922 American silent romance drama film produced by and starring Betty Compson and directed by Arthur Rosson.

The film is incomplete and preserved at the UCLA Film and Television Archive.

Plot
Celia Thaxter (Compson) is an American vaudeville actress who is on a journey to Egypt, becoming engaged to Reginald Stanhope (Gerald Pring) during the voyage. Once they reach the Sahara desert, the couple becomes part of a treasure hunt led by another passenger native to the region, Kelim Pasha (Macey Harlam). During the trek, Pasha starts coming on to Celia, while Stanhope does nothing to help her, as it's revealed that he was merely a tool of Pasha. Celia is eventually saved by another woman in the party, who kills Pasha, and Celia finds true romance at last with an American whose life she had saved during her voyage.

Cast
 Betty Compson as Celia Thaxter
 Emory Johnson as Herbert Boone
 Doris Pawn as Adele Boone
 Gerald Pring as Reginald Stanhope
 Richard Rosson as Mahmud
 Arthur Delmore as Gregory Gallup
 Macey Harlam as Kelim Pasha

References

External links

 
 

1922 films
American silent feature films
Films directed by Arthur Rosson
Goldwyn Pictures films
Films based on short fiction
1922 romantic drama films
American romantic drama films
American black-and-white films
1920s American films
Silent romantic drama films
Silent American drama films